Edmund Hungerford was the member of the Parliament of England for Marlborough for the parliament of 1586.

References 

Members of Parliament for Marlborough
English MPs 1586–1587
Year of birth unknown
Year of death unknown